Slovak football clubs have participated in European football competitions since 1956. Before 1993 Slovakia was a part of Czechoslovakia, therefore Slovak teams represented this country and did not always have a spot in European competitions.

All statistics and records are accurate as of 1 December 2020.

Statistics

 Most European Cup/Champions League competitions appeared in: 13 – Slovan 
 Most Inter-Cities Fairs Cup/UEFA Cup/Europa League competitions appeared in: 21 – Slovan 
 Most UEFA Europa Conference League competitions appeared in: 1 – 4 clubs
 Most Cup Winners' Cup competitions appeared in: 7 – Slovan 
 Most Intertoto Cup competitions appeared in: 4 – Trenčín
 Most competitions appeared in overall: 39 – Slovan 
 First match played: Slovan 4–0 CWKS Warsaw, 12 September 1956 (1956–57 European Cup, preliminary round)
 Most matches played: 166 – Slovan 
 Most match wins: 70 – Slovan 
 Most match draws: 37 – Slovan
 Most match losses: 59 – Slovan 

 Biggest win (match): 10 goals:
   Rabat Ajax 0–10 Inter (1983–84 UEFA Cup first round)
 Biggest win (aggregate): 16 goals:
  Inter 16–0 Rabat Ajax (1983–84 UEFA Cup first round)
 Biggest defeat (match): 7 goals
   Žilina 0–7 Marseille (2010–11 UEFA Champions League group stage)
   LASK 7–0 Dunajská Streda (2020–21 UEFA Europa League)
 Biggest defeat (aggregate): 9 goals, joint record:
   Púchov 1–10 Bordeaux (2002–03 UEFA Cup first round)

Appearances in UEFA competitions

App. = Appearances; P = Matches played; W = Matches won; D = Matches drawn; L = Matches lost; Teams in italics currently do not play in the top division

Slovak club distinctions in European competitions

European Cup / Champions League

Inter-Cities Fairs Cup/UEFA Cup/Europa League

Europa Conference League

Cup Winners' Cup

Active competitions

European Cup/Champions League

Inter-Cities Fairs Cup/UEFA Cup/Europa League

UEFA Europa Conference League

PR = Preliminary round; QR = Qualifying round; 1R/2R = First/Second round; 1QR/2QR/3QR = First/Second/Third qualifying round

Notes

Defunct competitions

Cup Winners' Cup

PR = Preliminary round; QR = Qualifying round; 1R/2R = First/Second round; QF = Quarter-finals

UEFA Intertoto Cup

GS = Group stage; 1R/2R = First/Second round

Record by country of opposition
As of 17 Mar 2022

Other competitions
This section contains the results in other competitions. These results do not count into statistics above.

UEFA Youth League
This section contains the results of Slovak football clubs in UEFA Youth League, a competition held by UEFA for youth teams.

Women's football
This section contains the results of Slovak football clubs in UEFA Women's Champions League, a competition held by UEFA for women's football teams.

UEFA coefficient and ranking
For the 2022–23 UEFA competitions, the associations were allocated places according to their 2021 UEFA country coefficients, which take into account their performance in European competitions from 2016–17 to 2020–12. In the 2021 rankings used for the 2022–23 European competitions, Slovakia's coefficient points total is 13.625 and is ranked by UEFA as the 32nd best association in Europe out of 55.

 30  15.125
 31  14.250
 32  13.625
 33 9.000
 34  8.750
 Full list

UEFA country coefficient history
(As of 13 Aug 2022), Source: Bert Kassies website.

References

External links
UEFA Website
Rec.Sport.Soccer Statistics Foundation

European football clubs in international competitions